Nanyue Huisi (515-577), was an eminent Chinese Buddhist monk, traditionally regarded  as the third patriarch of the Tiantai school.  
According to Sasaki, Huisi "was the leading authority on the Lotus Sutra of his time."

Biography
The earliest sources on Huisi's life are the "Vow Established by the Great Dhyana Master Huisi from Southern Peak", a work attributed to Huisi, Daoxuan´s hagiography in the "Continued Biographies of Eminent Monks" (續高僧傳 Xù gāosēng zhuàn) and in his "Catalogue of [Buddhist] Works in the Imperial Collection of the Great Tang".

Born with the surname Li in Wujin 武津 (Shangcai 上蔡, Henan 河南) in 515 CE,  Huisi left home to join the monastic order at fourteen.  
By the age of nineteen, he undertook the full monastic precepts, thus becoming a fully ordained monk. Then he  began visiting meditation masters in northern Henan.

He joined the community of Huiwen, who, according to Tiantai tradition, taught meditation techniques of the Great Perfection of Wisdom Treatise, a work purportedly written by Nagarjuna. 
Daoxuan (597-667) reports that after a ninety-day retreat under Huiwen's guidance, Huisi attained sudden enlightenment while leaning against a wall: "Within an instant of thought he attained the dharma-gate of the lotus samadhi". Guanding (561-632) writes: "The dharma-gates of both the Lesser Vehicle and Great Vehicle radiantly burst forth [for him]."  
Subsequently, Huisi began to give public lectures and to teach samadhi to an increasing number of disciples. However persecution by opposing monks, who ultimately tried to kill him, forced him to flee to south China in 552.

From 553-568 he lived and taught in Guangzhou. Among his disciples were several gifted monks like Zhiyi, who studied on Mt. Dasu under Huisi from 560 to 567. Zhiyi would become the fourth patriarch in the Tiantai lineage.  Daoxuan states that Huisi went to Mount Nan Yue in 568, where he founded the Yuquan Temple and trained his disciples.

The lotus samadhi
Huisi taught two different forms of the lotus samadhi. The "practice devoid of characteristics", or the practice of ease and bliss, is based on the fourteenth chapter of the Lotus Sutra. Huisi explains, "While in the very midst of phenomena [the practitioner discerns that] mental characteristics are quiescent and extinguished and ultimately do not arise. (...) He is constantly immersed in all the profound and wonderful dhyana absorptions because in all activities - walking, standing, sitting, lying down, eating or speaking - his mind is always settled [in samadhi]."

The "practice possessing distinguishing characteristics" is based on the 28th chapter of the Lotus Sutra, "The Encouragement of Bodhisattva Samantabhadra". It is focused on the practice of reciting the Lotus Sutra and repentance.

Works
Mahayana Method of Cessation and Contemplation (dasheng zhiguan famen, 大乘止觀法門, T 46, 1924)
Essential Methods for the Sequential Practice of Chan (ci di chan yao, 次第禪要, T 2060:50.564a16–17)
Dharma-Gate of the Samādhi Wherein All Dharmas are Without Dispute (zhufa wuzheng sanmai famen, 諸法無諍三昧. 法門, T 46, 1923)
The samadhi of freely following one's thought (sui ziyi sanmei)
The meaning of the course of ease and bliss in the Lotus Sutra (fahua jing anlexing yi, T 46,1926)
The Vow Established by the Great Dhyana Master Huisi from Southern Peak (Nanyue si da chan shi li shiyuan wen,  南嶽思大禪師立誓願文, T 46, 1933)

See also
Cheontae
Mahayana
Tendai

Notes

References

Sources

Greene, Eric M. (2012). Meditation, Repentance, and Visionary Experience in Early Medieval Chinese Buddhism, PhD Thesis, Berkeley: University of California

Keown, Damien (2003). A Dictionary of Buddhism, Oxford University Press.  

Lagerwey, John (2004). Religion and Chinese Society, Vol.1, Hong Kong: Chinese University Press; Paris: École française d'Extrême-Orient
Lamotte, Etienne (trans.); Nāgārjuna; Kumārajīva (1944).  Le traité de la grande vertu de sagesse de Nāgārjuna (Mahāprajñāpāramitāśāstra). Louvain: Bureaux du Muséon

Luk, Charles (1964). The Secrets of Chinese Meditation, London: Rider
Magnin, Paul (1979). La vie et l'œuvre de Huisi (Les origines de la secte bouddhique chinoise du Tiantai), École Française d’Extrême-Orient, Paris: Adrien Maisonneuve, 
Magnin, Paul (1995). Les notions de "ding" (meditation) et hui (sagesse) dans le oevre de Huisi (515-577 ),  Archéologie de la Chine,  École pratique des hautes études. 4e section, sciences historiques et philologiques. Livret 9. Rapports sur les conférences de l'année 1993-1994, pp. 152–153   
Muller, Charles (2009). To practice the method of cessation and clear observation, Digital Dictionary of Buddhism
Muller, Charles (2014).  Digital Dictionary of Buddhism, (entry: Huisi 慧思)
Ng, Yu-kwan (1990). Chih-i and Madhyamika, PhD dissertation, Hamilton, Ontario: McMaster University

Sasaki, Ruth Fuller; Kirchner, Thomas Yūhō (2009). The record of Linji, Honolulu: University of Hawaiʻi Press. .
 
Stevenson, Daniel B. (1986). The Four Kinds of Samādhi in Early T'ien-t'ai Buddhism. In: Peter N. Gregory: Traditions of Meditation in Chinese Buddhism Vol. 1, Honolulu: University of Hawaii Press, pp. 45–98. .
Stevenson, Daniel B; Kanno, Hiroshi (2006). The meaning of the Lotus sūtra's course of ease and bliss: an annotated translation and study of Nanyue Huisi's (515-577) Fahua jing anlexing yi, Tokyo: International Research Institute for Advanced Buddhology, Soka University.

Further reading
 Hurvitz, Leon (1980).  Review: La vie et l'œuvre de Huisi 慧思 (515-577) (Les origines de la secte bouddhique chinoise du Tiantai) by Paul Magnin, T'oung Pao, Second Series, 66 (4/5), 342-348 
 Hurvitz, Leon (1962). Chih-i (538–597): An Introduction to the Life and Ideas of a Chinese Buddhist Monk. Mélanges Chinois et Bouddhiques XII, Bruxelles: Institut Belge des Hautes Études Chinoises, pp. 86ff, 108ff
 
 Kawakatsu, Yoshio (1981). A propos de la pensée de Huisi, Bulletin de l'École française d'Extrême-Orient  69, 97-105
 Magnin, Paul (1982). La Vie et l'œuvre de Huisi (515-577) second patriarche du Tiantai, École pratique des hautes études. 4e section, Sciences historiques et philologiques, pp. 24–29

External links
 Su-ju Cheng (2007). A Study of Huisi's Meditation System

Tiantai Buddhists
515 births
577 deaths
Liang dynasty Buddhist monks
6th-century Chinese people
Writers from Zhumadian
Chen dynasty Buddhist monks
Chinese spiritual writers
Northern and Southern dynasties writers